

Arkansas state forests

 Poison Springs State Forest - Ouachita County

See also
 List of U.S. National Forests

External links
 Arkansas Forestry Commission

Arkansas
State forests